The Guarani Wikipedia is the Guarani language edition of the free online encyclopedia Wikipedia. It was created in 2005, thanks to the unusual collaboration between the Lithuanian Šarūnas Šimkus, then a teenager, and Paraguayan academic David Galeano Olivera.

Users and editors

See also 
 History of Wikipedia
 Reliability of Wikipedia
 Wikipedia community

References

External links 

 Guarani Wikipedia 
 Guarani Wikipedia (mobile) 

Guarani languages
Guarani